The 9th Artistic Gymnastics World Championships were held in Lyon on 12–14 July 1930.

Of special note is that a Yugoslavian Olympic medallist from 1928, Anton Malej, died one day after the conclusion of these games resulting from an injury, on the Rings apparatus, incurred during the games.

Men's individual all around

Men's floor

Men's pommel horse

Men's rings

Men's parallel bars

Men's horizontal bar

Men's team all around

Medal table

References

 Sports123

World Artistic Gymnastics Championships
Gym
Gym
Gym